Adnan Kanurić (born 8 August 2000) is a professional football goalkeeper who plays for Oxford City on loan from Premier League club Nottingham Forest. Born in Austria, he has represented Bosnia and Herzegovina at several youth international levels up to the under-21s.

Club career

Stoke City
Kanurić joined Stoke City in August 2018. On 3 November 2019, he was loaned out to Grantham Town for the rest of the season. Kanurić played 9 games in total for the club before the deal was terminated in early 2020.

iClinic Sereď
On 7 February 2020, Fortuna Liga club iClinic Sereď confirmed the signing of Kanurić on a deal until summer 2022. He made his Fortuna Liga debut for Sereď against Ružomberok on 15 February 2020.

Sarajevo
In October 2020, Kanurić joined Bosnian Premier League club Sarajevo.

Nottingham Forest
On 20 September 2022, Kanurić signed with Premier League side Nottingham Forest on a free transfer. On 4 February 2023, he moved on loan to National League South side Oxford City for the remainder of the season.

International career
Kanurić represented Bosnia and Herzegovina on all youth levels.

Career statistics

Club

Honours
Sarajevo
Bosnian Cup: 2020–21

References

External links
Futbalnet profile

2000 births
Living people
Footballers from Linz
Bosnia and Herzegovina footballers
Bosnia and Herzegovina youth international footballers
Bosnia and Herzegovina under-21 international footballers
Austrian footballers
Austrian people of Bosnia and Herzegovina descent
Association football goalkeepers
Stoke City F.C. players
Grantham Town F.C. players
ŠKF Sereď players
FK Sarajevo players
Nottingham Forest F.C. players
Oxford City F.C. players
Northern Premier League players
Slovak Super Liga players
Premier League of Bosnia and Herzegovina players
Bosnia and Herzegovina expatriate footballers
Austrian expatriate footballers
Expatriate footballers in England
Expatriate footballers in Slovakia
Bosnia and Herzegovina expatriate sportspeople in England
Bosnia and Herzegovina expatriate sportspeople in Slovakia
Austrian expatriate sportspeople in England
Austrian expatriate sportspeople in Slovakia